Messestadt Riem (literally: Convention City Riem; Central Bavarian: Messestod Ream) is an urban district in the east of Munich. It is part of the municipality 15 Trudering-Riem, and located entirely on the grounds of the 1992 abandoned Munich-Riem airport and includes today, along with a residential area, the Neue Messe München trade fair center and the Riem Arcaden shopping mall.

History 
Messestadt Riem is, after Freiham, the second youngest district of Munich. After the flight operation was moved in 1992 to the new Munich Airport, the old airport building in Riem could be emptied and the construction of the new exhibition center started from the mid-1990s, with the corresponding rapid transit connections in the following years. In 1998, the fair could finally move out of their exhibition halls on the Theresienhöhe to the spacious new building in the fair city. Many other companies also moved and established themselves on the former airport site.
Immediately west of the west entrance, the Messesee (Fair lake) was created, 390 m long (north-south) and 46 to 94 m wide (east-west), with a water area of 2.6 hectare.

In the southern part of the former airport a development area with rental apartments and condominiums was created. With the Riem Arcaden, shopping for daily items is easily accomplished, and because of the numerous pedestrian zones, many kindergartens and three primary schools the fair site is a suitable location for young families to live. The first projects for car-free living in Munich have been established here since 1998.
The first multi-family passive house and the first multifamily zero-energy house in Munich were created here.

Riemer Park 
South of the residential area is the Riemer Park. In 2005, the Bundesgartenschau was held here after Munich won the corresponding competition in 2000. For this purpose Riemer Park, a large landscaped park, was built in 2002. After the Bundesgartenschau Riemer Park, the third largest park in the city of Munich, was opened to the public as a recreation area. With enormous effort, a lake was created in its center, known under the name Buga Lake (officially Riemer lake). The lake is east to west 800 m long, 150 m wide, 10 ha in size, up to 18 m deep and contains 100,000 m3 of water. It is an upscale ground water reserve, which can also be used for bathing. Because the water table is too low in the area and also varies greatly seasonally, a concrete trough was applied and the three pumps, each pumping a constant 40 liters of water per second into the lake, stopping the water from accumulating and causing flooding in the basements of surrounding residential buildings, among other things a drain pipe was laid under the sea. On the east bank there is a beach, while on the west bank, where a pedestrian bridge leads over the lake, a sedimentation zone was created with aquatic plants. Located near the west bank is two more, shallow sedimentation basins with water plants that are only 1100 and 800 m2 in size.

Churches 
In 2005, in the West of Messestadt Riem, an ecumenical church center where the Protestant St. Sophia and the Catholic St. Florian churches were dedicated and opened.

Transportation 
Messestadt Riem is connected to two rapid transport stations of Munich U-Bahn, as well as, the bus lines 139, 186, 189, 190 and N74. The Autobahn 94 passes to the north of the fair city. Discussions are ongoing about a railway connection to Messestadt Riem as part of the Erding Ring Closure to the airport.

References 

Quarters of Munich
Trade fairs in Germany
Urban planning